Donna Richardson Joyner (born November 3, 1962) is an American fitness and aerobics instructor, author and ESPN television sports commentator. Widely known for her series of fitness videos, she was appointed in 2006 by President George W. Bush to serve on the President's Council on Physical Fitness and Sports.  She also produces and hosts Donna Richardson: Mind, Body, & Spirit, which airs on TV One, and Sweating In The Spirit, which airs on The Word Network.

She has served on the Women's Sports Foundation Board of Trustees and is an Advisory Board Member for the Boys and Girls Clubs of America.

Biography
Richardson is a native of Silver Spring, Maryland where she graduated from Montgomery Blair High School. She was Blair's first African-American homecoming queen.  Richardson cites Saundra Woods of Montgomery County Public Schools (teaches at White Oak Middle School as of Oct 08) as the teacher who most influenced her to excel and attain success.  She graduated from Hollins College with a degree in Health Education and Dance.

Personal life
Richardson met popular syndicated radio personality Tom Joyner in 1997 after being a guest on his radio show. They became engaged one year later in August 1998, while in Philadelphia en route to the airport.  On July 29, 2000, Richardson married Joyner in Montego Bay, Jamaica and had a week-long honeymoon in Venice Italy.   A report in December 2012 announced that Richardson and Tom Joyner had separated, in May 2012, in order to divorce.  The New York Daily News stated that the separation is “mutual but not exactly amicable.”

She resides in Dallas, Texas. Despite this, she is a staunch Washington Redskins supporter.

Fitness career
Certified by AFAA and ACE as an International Fitness Expert, Richardson-Joyner began her fitness career as an aerobics instructor, after responding to a challenge to take an aerobics class. She eventually moved on to teach other instructors. Eventually she began to compete nationally and internationally in aerobics competitions.

In 1992 she was hired as a co-host of the ESPN Fitness Pros Show and co-starred in her first commercial fitness tape, Platinum Buns of Steel.

Richardson Joyner was selected by The Oprah Winfrey Show as one of the "Top 5 Fitness Video Instructors".  She was selected by Fitness magazine as one of their "Top 10 Movers and Shakers" and was inducted into the National Fitness Hall of Fame.

Richardson Joyner not only was the star of Sweating in the Spirit, she was also the executive producer.

Richardson Joyner has lectured in 40 countries and has been a featured motivational speaker with several national tours including God's Leading Ladies, Sisters In The Spirit and the Pantene Total You.

Donna was named by Essence magazine for being “one out of 25 most inspiring women in America” in 2006.

Richardson Joyner is in the Guinness Book of World Records for creating and leading the world's largest line dance, with over 50,000 participants at Megafest hosted by Bishop T. D. Jakes in Atlanta, Georgia.

Print/media

Books

Visual media

DVDs

VHS videocassettes

External links

Footnotes

1962 births
Living people
Aerobic exercise
American exercise and fitness writers
American exercise instructors
American television personalities
American women television personalities
African-American television personalities
Hollins University alumni
People from Silver Spring, Maryland
21st-century African-American people
21st-century African-American women
20th-century African-American people